The Law of Serbia comprises many levels of codified and uncodified forms of law, of which the most important is the Serbian Constitution.

Sources 
The Official Gazette of the Republic of Serbia is the government gazette containing the laws, regulations and other documents. It is published by the public company Official Gazette.

History

Early Middle age 
From the 8th to the 13th century, social relations were regulated by common law.  The first elements and texts of middle age Serbian law were made in the 12th century. In the 14th and 15th centuries there were many new legal documents that coincided with the political and economic rise of Serbia. The influence of the Nemanjić family was enormous. During their regency, Serbia gained independence and started to develop its first legal system.

Zakonopravilo 
During the Nemanjić dynasty (1166–1371), the Serbian medieval state flourished in the spheres of politics, religion, and culture. A large number of monasteries were built, far more than in previous centuries. Development and urbanization increased. One of the key contributions to Serbian law made by the Nemanjić family was the Zakonopravilo. Also known as the Nomocanon of Sveti Sava (Rastko Nemanjić), this document was the first Serbian constitution and the highest code in the Serbian Orthodox Church.

Initiated when the Serbian church gained independence (1219), the text comprises a combination of church regulations.  The Zakonopravilo includes 64 articles of differencing length. The 55th article originates from civil (common) law and is divided in 40 branches.

Dušan's Code 
Dušan's Code, (Serbian: Dušanov zakonik/Душанов законик), known historically as Закон благовјернаго цара Стефана, is a compilation of several legal systems that was enacted by Stephen Uroš IV Dušan of Serbia in 1349. It was used in the Serbian Empire and in the succeeding Serbian Despotate. Dušan's code is considered as an early constitution; an advanced set of laws which regulated all aspects of life. The Code was promulgated at a state council on May 21, 1349, in Skopje, the capital of the Serbian Empire.  Emperor Dušan added a series of articles to it in 1353 or 1354, at a council in Serres. This second part was half the size and at times cited issues from the first part, referring to it as the "First Code". The second part had a total of 201 articles. Four of them (79, 123, 152, 153), regarding various subjects, referred to the authority of the "Law of the Sainted King" (i.e. Stephen Uroš II Milutin of Serbia, r. 1282–1321, Dušan's grandfather), which suggests that Milutin had issued a code whose text did not survive. By this assumption, it would appear that Dušan's Code was a supplement to Milutin's Code.  As well, it was a supplement to the various Church law codes that held authority in Serbia.

Dušan's Code had several additional influences.  It was influenced by the Syntagma Canonum, a text written in 1335 by Matthew Blastares, which had been translated into Serbian and received legal authority by 1349. It was heavily influenced by Byzantine law with some reflections in nearly half of its articles, including many articles concerning the church as well as many with influence from Byzantine civil law.  Notable Byzantine influence includes the late 9th century compilation by Basil I and Leo VI.

Scholars A. Solovjev and Soulis conclude that the Council of 1349 issued a three-part comprehensive legal document, since most early manuscripts of the Code also contain two other texts: The first part was an abridgement of the Syntagma, the second part was the "Code of Justinian" (an abridgement of The Partner's Law), and the third part was always Dušan's Code itself. According to Fine, there is a possibility that the Code was written to supplement the first two parts, by adding items that were not covered, rather than to build a comprehensive legal system.

Legal sources 
There are many legal sources, such as: charters, a contract with Dubrovnik, Byzantine legal compilations translated in Serbia, Dušans Act, Law on Mines by Stefan Lazarević, and the statute of coastal towns. Charters are legal acts made for many law reasons. Those are grants with which rulers give away to churches and monasteries properties with benefits. They were written in such way that there was a certain established form, introduction, text, and conclusion.

See also 
 Jemstvenik

References

External links 
  
 Official Gazette archive ]